RCHM may refer to

Royal Commission on the Historical Monuments of England
Royal Commission on Historical Manuscripts (though this is more usually abbreviated as HMC)